Lady Ye was the first wife of Dongmyeong of Goguryeo and mother of his successor, Yuri of Goguryeo.

Life
When Chumo was in Buyeo, he married Lady Ye and she became pregnant before he escaped from there due to threats from Daeso, the Prince of Buyeo. Later, she gave birth to Yuryu and raised him without her husband.

As Yuryu became older, he questioned Lady Ye about his father. She told Yuryu that his father was not welcomed by Buyeo, thus went to south and became the king of newly founded kingdom. She also said Chumo purposely hid an object under the pine tree supported by the rock with seven angles as a certificate of his son. After Yuryu found the broken sword, in B.C. 19, Lady Ye came to Goguryeo from Buyeo with Yuryu.

In popular culture
 Portrayed as Ye So-ya by Song Ji-hyo in the 2006–2007 MBC TV series Jumong.

References

Goguryeo
Year of birth unknown
19 BC deaths
Korean royal consorts
Ancient queens consort